Marcia Mae Jones (August 1, 1924 – September 2, 2007) was an American film and television actress whose prolific career spanned 57 years.

Early years 
Jones was the youngest of four children born to actress Freda Jones. All three of her siblings, Margaret, Macon, and Marvin Jones, were also child actors. Their relationship was strained by their unequal status in the film world. "I constantly heard, 'You've got to be quiet;  Marcia Mae has to learn her lines.' It was Marcia Mae this and Marcia Mae that. That's where the jealousy from my siblings came from. They blamed me for it, when it was my mother who was doing it."

Career
Jones made her film debut at the age of two in the 1926 film Mannequin. She appeared in films such as King of Jazz (1930), Street Scene (1931), and Night Nurse (1931) before rising to child stardom in the 1930s with roles in The Champ (1931) and, alongside Shirley Temple in Heidi (1937) and The Little Princess (1939).  She also starred in films such as The Garden of Allah (1936), These Three (1936), and The Adventures of Tom Sawyer (1938). In the 1937 film Mountain Justice she played Bettie Harkins as seen on TCM.

Jones blossomed into a wide-eyed, blonde, wholesome-looking teenager, and worked steadily in motion pictures through her late teens. She appeared in First Love (1939), in support of Deanna Durbin. In 1940, Monogram Pictures signed her to co-star with Jackie Moran in a few rustic romances; when this series lapsed, both Jones and Moran joined Monogram's popular action-comedy series starring Frankie Darro.

As a young adult, she continued to work in motion pictures, notably in Nine Girls (1944) and Arson, Inc. (1948). Like many familiar faces of the 1940s, she appeared on numerous television programs. In 1951 she appeared as comic foil to Buster Keaton in Keaton's filmed TV series. She went on to work in such top-rated shows as The Cisco Kid, The Adventures of Wild Bill Hickok, The George Burns and Gracie Allen Show, Peyton Place,  and General Hospital. Her last major role was in the Barbra Streisand film The Way We Were in 1973.

Personal life
Jones was married to Robert Chic and had two sons with him. Her second marriage was to television writer Bill Davenport.

Death
On September 2, 2007, Jones died in Woodland Hills, California, of complications of pneumonia. She was 83.

Partial filmography

 Mannequin (1926) - Joan Herrick as a baby (uncredited)
 Smile, Brother, Smile (1927)
 The Bishop Murder Case (1929) - Hungry Child in Park (uncredited)
 King of Jazz (1930) - Bridesmaid ('My Bridal Veil') (uncredited)
 Night Nurse (1931) - Nanny Ritchey (uncredited)
 Street Scene (1931) - Mary - Little Girl (uncredited)
 The Champ (1931) - Mary Lou Carleton
 What Price Hollywood? (1932) - Flower Girl at wedding (uncredited)
 Birthday Blues (1932, Short) - Girl with Whistle
 Employees' Entrance (1933) - Flower Girl at Wedding (uncredited)
 Mush and Milk (1933, Short) - Orphan (as Our Gang)
 Doctor Bull (1933) - Ruth - School Girl (uncredited)
 Imitation of Life (1934) - Peola's Frontrow Classmate (uncredited)
 The County Chairman (1935) - Schoolgirl (uncredited)
 A Dog of Flanders (1935) - Little Girl at Party (uncredited)
 This Is the Life (1935) - Girl at Picnic (uncredited)
 These Three (1936) - Rosalie
 Gentle Julia (1936) - Patty Fairchild (uncredited)
 The Garden of Allah (1936) - Convent Girl #1 (uncredited)
 Two Wise Maids (1937) - Geraldine 'Jerry ' Karns
 Mountain Justice (1937) - Bethie Harkins
 The Life of Emile Zola (1937) - Helen Richards
 Heidi (1937) - Klara Sesemann
 Lady Behave! (1937) - Patricia Cormack
 The Adventures of Tom Sawyer (1938) - Mary Sawyer
 Mad About Music (1938) - Olga
 Barefoot Boy (1938) - Pige Blaine
 The Little Princess (1939) - Lavinia
 The Flying Irishman (1939) - Teenager Posing For Photograph (uncredited)
 First Love (1939) - Marcia Parker
 Meet Dr. Christian (1939) - Marilee
 Tomboy (1940) - Pat Kelly
 Anne of Windy Poplars (1940) - Jen Pringle
 Haunted House (1940) - Mildred 'Millie' Henshaw
 The Old Swimmin' Hole (1940) - Betty Elliott
 Nice Girl? (1941) - Jane's Friend at Benefit
 The Gang's All Here (1941) - Patsy Wallace
 Let's Go Collegiate (1941) - Bess Martin
 Secrets of a Co-Ed (1942) - Laura Wright
 The Youngest Profession (1943) - Vera Bailey
 Nobody's Darling (1943) - Lois
 Top Man (1943) - Erna Lane
 Nine Girls (1944) - Shirley Berke
 Lady in the Death House (1944) - Suzy Kirk Logan
 Snafu (1945) - Martha
 Street Corner (1948) - Lois Marsh
 Trouble Preferred (1948) - Virginia Evans
 Tucson (1949) - Polly Johnson
 Arson, Inc. (1949) - Betty - Fender's Secretary
 The Daughter of Rosie O'Grady (1950) - Katie O'Grady
 Hi-Jacked (1950) - Jean Harper
 Chicago Calling (1951) - Peggy
 The Star (1952) - Waitress (uncredited)
 Live a Little, Love a Little (1968) - Woman #1 (uncredited)
 Rogue's Gallery (1968) - Mrs. Hassanover
 The Way We Were (1973) - Peggy Vanderbilt
 The Spectre of Edgar Allan Poe (1974) - Sarah

References

Further reading

External links

 
 
 

1924 births
2007 deaths
American child actresses
American film actresses
American soap opera actresses
American television actresses
Actresses from Los Angeles
Deaths from pneumonia in California
Our Gang
20th-century American actresses
21st-century American women